Hrushka (Czech/Slovak: Hruška, Russian/Ukrainian: Грушка) may refer to:

 the Ukrainian name for Hruşca, a commune in Transnistria, Moldova
 the Romanized version of the surname Gruszka
 David Allan Hrushka (fl. 2008), Canadian politician
 Father Hryhoriii Hrushka, founder of the newspaper Svoboda, Jersey City, New Jersey, U.S.

See also 
 Gruszka (disambiguation), including Gruschka and Grushka
 Hruška (disambiguation)
 Hruška (surname), including Hruska, Hruszka, Hruschka, Hrushka